Matan Baltaxa (or Baltaksa, ; born 20 September 1995) is an Israeli footballer who plays for Austria Wien.

Early life
Baltaxa was born in Shoham, Israel, to a Jewish family. He served as a soldier in the Israel Defense Forces.

International career
He made his debut for Israel national football team on 9 June 2021 in a friendly against Portugal.

Honours

Club
Bnei Yehuda
 Israel State Cup (1): 2016–17

Maccabi Tel Aviv
 Toto Cup (1): 2020-21
 Israel Super Cup (2): 2019, 2020

References 

1995 births
Israeli Jews
Jewish footballers
Living people
Israeli footballers
Israel international footballers
Hapoel Petah Tikva F.C. players
Maccabi Tel Aviv F.C. players
Hapoel Acre F.C. players
Bnei Yehuda Tel Aviv F.C. players
FK Austria Wien players
Israeli expatriate footballers
Expatriate footballers in Austria
Israeli expatriate sportspeople in Austria
Liga Leumit players
Israeli Premier League players
Austrian Football Bundesliga players
Association football wingers
Footballers from Shoham